The Ireland cricket team toured the West Indies in January 2022 to play three One Day International (ODI) matches and a one-off Twenty20 International (T20I) match. The ODI series formed part of the inaugural 2020–2023 ICC Cricket World Cup Super League. On 6 December 2021, the full schedule for the tour was confirmed by both cricket boards. Ireland last toured the West Indies in January 2020. Prior to the series, the Irish team were scheduled to play five white ball matches against the United States in Florida. However, the ODI matches were cancelled due to COVID-19 cases within the squads.

The second ODI, originally scheduled to be played on 11 January 2022, was postponed after Ireland captain Andrew Balbirnie, wicket-keeper Lorcan Tucker and interim head coach David Ripley tested positive for COVID-19. On 11 January 2022, both cricket boards agreed to reschedule the remaining fixtures, with the one-off T20I match being cancelled. With Balbirnie ruled out of the remaining matches, Paul Stirling was named as Ireland's captain for the second and third ODIs.

Ahead of the ODI series, Ireland played a 50-over tour match against Jamaica, losing the fixture by five wickets. The West Indies won the first ODI match by 24 runs, with Shamarh Brooks on debut top-scoring with 93. The second ODI was shortened due to rain, with Ireland winning the match by five wickets to level the series. Ireland won the third and final ODI by two wickets to win the series 2–1. Other than Afghanistan and Zimbabwe, it was Ireland's first ODI series win against a Test side. It was also Ireland's first ODI series win away from home against an ICC Full Member team.

Squads

Cricket West Indies named Keacy Carty and Sheldon Cottrell as reserves in their ODI squad, with Jayden Seales, Alzarri Joseph and Devon Thomas named as reserves in their T20I squad. Simi Singh and Ben White were both ruled out of Ireland's squad for the first ODI after providing positive COVID-19 tests. Singh and White were later ruled out of the rest of the series, after returning another positive test for COVID-19. Ireland's Paul Stirling and Shane Getkate also missed the first ODI, after they had to remain in the United States following positive COVID-19 tests, but rejoined the squad ahead of the second ODI. Andrew Balbirnie and Lorcan Tucker tested positive for COVID-19 ahead of the second ODI, resulting in the match being postponed.

Tour match

ODI series

1st ODI

2nd ODI

3rd ODI

Notes

References

External links
 Series home at ESPN Cricinfo

2021 in Irish cricket
2021 in West Indian cricket
Irish cricket tours of the West Indies
International cricket competitions in 2021–22
Cricket events curtailed due to the COVID-19 pandemic